Mikell Randolph Ballou (born September 11, 1947 in Los Angeles, California) was a linebacker in the National Football League who played for the Boston Patriots in 1970. He attended Los Angeles High School, then Santa Monica College and finally the University of California - Los Angeles before being drafted by the Patriots in the third round, 56th overall, of the 1970 NFL Draft.

References

Living people
1947 births
Players of American football from Los Angeles
Boston Patriots players
American football linebackers
UCLA Bruins football players
Santa Monica Corsairs football players